The men's national football teams of the four Home Nations of the United Kingdom have played each other more times than any other footballing nations in the world. The world's first international football match was played between Scotland and England in Glasgow in 1872 (a 0–0 draw). From then on, all four teams started playing regular friendlies against each other. In 1883 a formal competition between the UK's teams, the British Home Championship, was introduced, guaranteeing that each team would play the other three at least once a season. The Championship was discontinued in 1984, partly due to problems of crowd trouble, and partly due to the desire of England (and to a lesser extent Scotland) to contest international fixtures against larger and more powerful nations.

While the British Home Championship was being played, the UK teams were also drawn together on a number of occasions during qualification competitions for the FIFA World Cup and UEFA European Championship. Early tournaments simply used the British Championship as a qualifying group, but during qualification for the 1974 World Cup, England and Wales were drawn in the same group. Subsequent to this, three more qualification tournaments saw UK teams drawn together while the British Championship was being played. Since the end of the British Home Championship, the teams have played each other mainly when drawn together in international competitions such as the European Championship or the World Cup, with occasional friendly fixtures.

At men's major national tournaments, Home Nations teams have met four times at the UEFA European Championships. England and Wales played the first ever Home Nations tie at a World Cup when they played each other at the 2022 FIFA World Cup in Qatar with England winning the match 3-0.

Teams –

FIFA World Cup

UEFA European Championship

British Home Championship

The British Home Championship (also known as the Home International Championship, the Home Internationals and the British Championship) was an annual football competition contested between the United Kingdom's four national teams: England, Scotland, Wales and Northern Ireland (the last of whom competed as Ireland for most of the competition's history).  Starting during the 1883–84 season, it was the oldest international football tournament and it was contested until the 1983–84 season, when it was abolished after 100 years.

The 1949–50 and 1953–54 championships doubled up as qualifying stages for the 1950 FIFA World Cup and 1954 FIFA World Cup respectively.

Friendlies

Others

Head to head

England

Northern Ireland

Scotland

Wales

British Overseas Territories
Seven British Overseas Territories have a national football team affiliated to FIFA – Anguilla, Bermuda, British Virgin Islands, Cayman Islands, Gibraltar, Montserrat and Turks and Caicos Islands. All play within the CONCACAF (North American) area, with the exception of Gibraltar. This makes fixtures between the Home Nations and the overseas territories rare, although the North American overseas territories play between each other often.

In 2013, the Gibraltar Football Association became a member of UEFA enabling their national team to play international fixtures. This opened the possibility of Gibraltar playing against a Home Nation during the qualification phase of major international competitions. To date, there have only been two matches between Gibraltar and one of the Home Nations – Scotland played them twice as part of their UEFA Euro 2016 qualification group, beating them on both occasions. These fixtures are the only occasions when a Home Nation and an overseas territory have played each other in an official international match.

Matches between CONCACAF overseas territories

Unofficial matches

See also
 England–Scotland football rivalry
 List of football matches between British clubs in UEFA competitions

References

national team matches
England national football team lists
Northern Ireland national football team
Scotland national football team matches
Wales national football team